The following lists events that happened during 2010 in New Zealand.

Population
 Estimated population as of 31 December: 4,373,900
 Increase since 31 December 2009: 41,700 (0.96%)
 Males per 100 Females: 95.7

Incumbents

Regal and vice-regal
Head of State – Elizabeth II
Governor-General – Sir Anand Satyanand

Government
2010 was the second full year of the 49th Parliament.

Speaker of the House – Lockwood Smith
Prime Minister – John Key
Deputy Prime Minister – Bill English
Minister of Finance – Bill English
Minister of Foreign Affairs – Murray McCully

Other party leaders
Labour – Phil Goff (Leader of the Opposition)
Act – Rodney Hide, since 13 June 2004
Greens – Metiria Turei (since 30 May 2009) and Russel Norman (since 3 June 2006)
Māori Party – Tariana Turia and Pita Sharples

Judiciary
Chief Justice — Sian Elias

Main centre leaders
Mayor of Auckland – John Banks since October 2007, followed by Len Brown for the Auckland super city
Mayor of Tauranga – Stuart Crosby, since October 2004
Mayor of Hamilton – Bob Simcock since May 2007, followed by Julie Hardaker in October 2010
Mayor of Wellington – Kerry Prendergast since October 2001, followed by Celia Wade-Brown in October 2010
Mayor of Christchurch – Bob Parker, since October 2007
Mayor of Dunedin – Peter Chin succeeded by Dave Cull

Events

January
17–19 January: Prince William of Wales visits New Zealand, and represents The Queen officially for the first time by opening the new Supreme Court building in Wellington.

February

March

April
25 April: Three members of the air force are killed when their Iroquois helicopter crashes on the way to Wellington for Anzac day commemorations.

May

June

July
13 July: Two police officers are injured and police dog Gage is killed after being confronted by an armed offender during a routine drugs search in Phillipstown, Christchurch. Gage would later be posthumously awarded the PDSA Gold Medal after taking a fatal gunshot wound protecting his injured handler.

August
4 August: Lieutenant Tim O'Donnell becomes the first New Zealand fatality of the War in Afghanistan after his convoy is attacked.

September
4 September
 The 7.1 magnitude 2010 Canterbury earthquake causes widespread damage and several power outages, particularly in Christchurch.
 All nine passengers on board are killed in a Fletcher FU24 crash, the worst aircraft crash in New Zealand in 17 years.
 17 September: MP and Corrections Minister David Garrett resigns from the ACT party caucus after revelations that in 1984 he obtained a false passport using details of a deceased child.
17–22 September: A "storm the size of Australia" passes to the south of New Zealand bringing snow, rain, gales, tornadoes and causing widespread damage – 72,000 homes lose power, and the roof of a stadium collapses under a snow load in Invercargill and numerous roads are closed.

October
 1 October: The largest reform in the tax system since the 1980s takes effect: GST is raised to 15%, company tax rates drop from 30% to 28%, and the top tax bracket falls from 38% to 33%.
 5 October: Breakfast broadcaster Paul Henry is suspended by TVNZ after questioning if New Zealand's ethnic minority Governor-General Anand Satyanand, is a proper New Zealander. On 7 October Henry is embroiled in further controversy as his mockery of Delhi Chief Minister Sheila Dikshit is declared "racist" and "unacceptable" and New Zealand's ambassador to India is summoned for a dressing down. Henry resigns from TVNZ on 10 October.
 9 October: Elections held for all of New Zealand's city, district and regional councils, and all District Health Boards.
 27 October: After crisis talks with Warner Bros executives, Prime Minister John Key announces the $670 million project to film The Hobbit will go ahead in New Zealand. Acting unions had threatened to boycott the movies, leading Warner Bros and New Line to consider taking the production elsewhere.

November
 19 November: A gas explosion in the Pike River coal mine traps 29 workers underground.
20 November: Labour candidate Kris Faafoi wins the 2010 Mana by-election

December
28 December: A storm moves up the country. Two bridges on the Aorere River are swept away, including the historic Salisbury Swing Bridge.

Holidays and observances

 6 February – Waitangi Day
 25 April – ANZAC Day
 2 June – Queen's Birthday Monday
 5 June – Matariki
 27 October – Labour Day

Awards

New Zealander of the year 
The inaugural awards take place.

New Zealander of the Year: Ray Avery
Senior New Zealander of the Year: Sir Eion Edgar
Young New Zealander of the Year: Divya Dhar
Community of the Year: Victory Village
Local Hero: Haami (Sam) Tutu Chapman

Arts and literature

New books

Music

Performing arts

 Benny Award presented by the Variety Artists Club of New Zealand to Gary Daverne ONZM.

Television

Film
 Boy
 Matariki
 Predicament
 Tracker
 Wound

Internet

Sports

Commonwealth Games

Cricket

Horse racing

Harness racing

Thoroughbred racing

Motorsport

Netball

Olympic Games

 New Zealand sends a team of 16 competitors in eight sports.

Paralympic Games

 New Zealand sends a team of two competitors in one sport.

Rowing
The 2010 World Rowing Championships were held at Lake Karapiro, near Hamilton, New Zealand between 29 October – 7 November.

Rugby league

New Zealand co-hosted the 2010 Four Nations and also won the tournament, defeating Australia in the final at Suncorp Stadium.
The New Zealand Warriors finished fifth in the National Rugby League, before being eliminated in the first round of the play-offs. The Junior Warriors won the Toyota Cup.
Auckland won the Albert Baskerville Trophy, defeating Counties Manukau in the final.

Rugby union

Shooting
Ballinger Belt – 
 Jonathan Cload (United Kingdom)
 Ross Geange (Otorohanga), second, top New Zealander

Soccer
At the 2010 FIFA World Cup finals in South Africa, New Zealand finish third in their pool after achieving three draws: 1–1 vs Slovakia, 1-1 vs Italy and 0-0 vs Paraguay.

Tennis

Births
 21 August – Suavito, Thoroughbred racehorse
 25 September – Puccini, Thoroughbred racehorse
 23 October – Tiger Tara, Standardbred racehorse

Deaths

January
 7 January – Peggy Dunstan, poet, writer (born 1920)
 12 January 
 Patricia Hook, religious sister, nurse and hospital administrator (born 1921)
 Elizabeth Moody, actor (born 1939)
 Juliet Peter, artist, potter, printmaker (born 1915)
 23 January – Douglas J. Martin, religious leader (born 1927)
 31 January – Pauly Fuemana, musician (born 1969)

February
 7 February – Peter Lorimer, mathematician (born 1939)
 8 February – Duncan McVey, association football player (born 1938)
 23 February – Richard Giese, flautist (born 1924)

March
 2 March – Mate Jakich, rugby union player (born 1940)
 13 March
 Sir Ian Axford, space scientist (born 1933)
 Terry Heffernan, politician (born 1952)
 17 March – Tim Chadwick, artist and author (born 1962)
 21 March – Margaret Moth, photojournalist (born 1951)
 25 March – Ben Gascoigne, astronomer (born 1915)
 28 March – Sir Gaven Donne, jurist, former Chief Justice of various Pacific nations (born 1914)
 30 March – Bruce Turner, field hockey player and cricketer (born 1930)

April
 2 April – Malcolm Hahn, athlete (born 1931)
 5 April – Jim Edwards, politician (born 1927)
 6 April – Tony MacGibbon, cricketer (born 1924)
 17 April – Mervyn Probine, physicist and public servant (born 1924)
 28 April – Elma Maua, journalist (born 1948)

May
 8 May – Deborah Pullen, association football player (born 1963)
 12 May – John Warham, photographer and ornithologist (born 1919)
 16 May – Jason Palmer, prison guard (born 1977)
 20 May – Hugh Morris, founder of McDonald's New Zealand (born 1929)
 21 May – Trevor Meale, cricketer (born 1928)
 22 May – Peter Hall, World War II flying ace (born 1922)
 23 May
 Beaver, singer (born 1950)
 Paul Reynolds, internet commentator (born 1949)
 30 May – Dame Pat Evison, actor (born 1924)
 31 May – Merata Mita, filmmaker (born 1942)

June
 3 June
 Ross Beever, geneticist and mycologist (born 1946)
 Bill Clark, rugby union player (born 1929)
 5 June – Sir Neil Anderson, naval officer (born 1927)
 6 June – Vincent Ingram, Cook Islands politician (born 1946)
 10 June – Paul Dobbs, motorcycle road racer (born 1970)
 27 June – Eric Godley, botanist and biographer (born 1919)

July
 7 July – Moko, bottlenose dolphin (born 2006)
 8 July – Scott Guy, farmer 
 10 July
 Eric Batchelor, soldier (born 1920)
 David Gay, soldier, cricketer and educator (born 1920)
 20 July
 Sir Randal Elliott, ophthalmologist (born 1922)
 Gus Fisher, fashion industry leader and philanthropist (born 1920)
 Sir Gordon Mason, local-body politician (born 1921)
 Peta Rutter, actor (born 1959)
 25 July – Barrie Devenport, Cook Strait swimmer (born 1935)
 28 July – Bob Quickenden, association footballer (born 1923)
 30 July – Esme Tombleson, politician (born 1917)

August
 1 August – Eric Tindill, cricketer and rugby player (born 1910)
 11 August – Sir Ron Trotter, businessman (born 1927)
 14 August – O. E. Middleton, writer (born 1925)
 17 August – Koro Dewes, Ngāti Porou kaumātua and Māori language advocate (born 1930)
 24 August – Sir Graham Liggins, medical scientist (born 1926)
 28 August – Sir Patrick O'Dea, public servant (born 1918)

September
 21 September – Sir Archie Taiaroa, Māori leader (born 1937)
 22 September – Graeme Hunt, journalist, author and historian (born 1952)
 25 September
 Allan Elsom, rugby union player (born 1925)
 Morrie McHugh, rugby union player (born 1917)

October
 7 October – Ian Morris, musician (born 1957)
 10 October – Les Gibbard, cartoonist (born 1945)
 27 October – Maurice Goodall, Anglican bishop (born 1928)
 28 October – Keith Bracey, broadcaster (born 1916)
 29 October – John Mudgeway, rugby player (born 1961)
 31 October – Alan Blake, rugby union player (born 1922)

November
 7 November – Kurt Baier, philosophy academic (born 1917)
 8 November – Tom Walker, soil science academic and television personality (born 1916)
 9 November – John Cunneen, eighth Bishop of the Roman Catholic Diocese of Christchurch (born 1932)
 14 November – Sir Gordon Bisson, naval officer and jurist (born 1918)
 17 November – Johnny Simpson, rugby player (born 1922)
 28 November – Te Aue Davis, Māori weaver (born 1925)

December
 4 December – Adrienne Simpson, broadcaster, historian, musicologist and writer (born 1943)
 14 December – Ruth Park, author (born 1917)
 15 December
 Tom Newnham, political activist and educationalist (born 1926)
 Sir Ross Jansen, local-body politician (born 1932)
 28 December – Denis Dutton, philosophy academic (born 1944)
 30 December – Rex Hamilton, sport shooter (born 1928)
 31 December – Syd Ward, cricketer (born 1907)

See also
List of years in New Zealand
Timeline of New Zealand history
History of New Zealand
Military history of New Zealand
Timeline of the New Zealand environment
Timeline of New Zealand's links with Antarctica

References

External links

 
New Zealand
New Zealand
2010s in New Zealand
Years of the 21st century in New Zealand